Eucalyptus × macmahonii is a species of mallee that is endemic to two small areas in Victoria. It has mostly smooth bark, lance-shaped leaves, flower buds in groups of between seven and eleven, white flowers and cup-shaped to cylindrical fruit.

Description
It has smooth reddish brown bark, sometimes with a few ribbons of loose bark near the base.

Taxonomy and naming
Eucalyptus × macmahonii was first formally described in 1997 by Kevin Rule from a specimen collected on the southern side of Mount Arapiles. Rule gave it the name Eucalyptus macmahonii and published the description in the journal Muelleria. The specific epithet (mcmahonii) honours "Dr Don McMahon who is credited with the discovery of this new species".

The Royal Botanic Gardens Victoria suggests that this species is a stabilised hybrid between E. phenax and E. wimmerensis.

Distribution and habitat
This mallee is only known from the type location and south of the Little Desert near Nurcoung where it grows in mallee communities.

See also
List of Eucalyptus species

References

mcmahonii
Myrtales of Australia
Flora of Victoria (Australia)
Plants described in 1997